William Francis "Pooch" Donovan Sr. (March 15, 1868 – August 21, 1928) was an American athletic trainer and coach. He was the head coach of Harvard Crimson track coach from 1908 to 1921 and 1925 to 1928, trainer of the Harvard Crimson football team from 1907 to 1925, head coach of the football team in 1918, and trainer for the Harvard Crimson baseball team from 1907 to 1928.

Biography
Donovan was born on March 15, 1868, in Natick, Massachusetts. He had a brother, Edward S. Donovan  who was called Piper Donovan, who was a noted track athlete. His first cousin, Keene Fitzpatrick, was the longtime track coach at the University of Michigan. Donovan competed in track and football and was a member of the Natick Ladder Truck Team with future college trainers Keene Fitzpatrick, Mike Murphy, and John J. Mack.

Donovan began his career in 1887 as an assistant trainer under Mike Murphy at Yale University. In 1893 he became the athletic trainer for the Cleveland Athletic Club. The following year he moved to Worcester, Massachusetts, and began training athletes at the Worcester Oval. In 1895 he became the physical director of the Worcester Academy. He served as the athletic trainer at Brown University from 1896 to 1897 then returned to the Worcester Academy, where he trained Arthur Duffey and John W. Mayhew. 

In August 1906, Donovan was hired by Harvard to train their football and baseball teams starting in the fall of 1907. In 1908 he became the coach of Harvard's track team. He coached the 1918 Harvard Crimson football team, which only played three games due to World War I. In 1921, Donovan was succeeded as track coach by W. J. Bingham, but stayed on as trainer of the football and baseball teams. In 1925, track coach Eddie Farrell replaced Donovan as trainer of the Harvard football team. Donovan served as track coach during the football season in Farrell's absence.

Donovan had a heart attack in Amsterdam after the 1928 Summer Olympics. He returned home on August 12, 1928. He died on August 21, 1928, and was buried on August 24, 1928.

Head coaching record

Football

References

1865 births
1928 deaths
Athletic trainers
Harvard Crimson baseball coaches
Harvard Crimson football coaches
Harvard Crimson track and field coaches
People from Natick, Massachusetts
Sportspeople from Middlesex County, Massachusetts
Track and field athletes from Massachusetts